Keith J. Sainsbury (born February 22, 1951) is the recipient of the 2004 Japan Prize and the Australian Book Publishers Association Award for Outstanding (Book) Design and Production. His research led to the understanding of the relevance seabed habitats have in assessing the capacity of key species, as well as the effect seabed trawling has in altering the communities. Sainsbury has a BS (with Honors) in Marine Ecology and Mathematics, a PhD. from the University of Canterbury, and was ranked a Wellington High School high achiever.

Previously, Sainsbury was also in charge of a research team which built the scientific basis used for complex planning and management of marine ecosystems in Australia's exclusive economic zone. This culminated in the attestation of large marine protected areas around Macquarie Island and off southern Tasmania.

Sainsbury has also written a variety of publications on ecology, tropical fisheries, ecosystem, etc. He chairs the technical advisory board of Marine Stewardship Council.

References

Living people
New Zealand zoologists
1951 births
Academic staff of the University of Tasmania
University of Canterbury alumni